Ernest Day, B.S.C. (15 April 1927 - 16 November 2006) was a British cinematographer and director of film and television, known for his collaborations with David Lean and Lewis Gilbert. He spent the majority of his career as a camera operator, often referred to Lean as his "eyes", and was the first British cameraman to operate a 70mm film camera. He was nominated for an Academy Award and BAFTA Award for Lean's final film A Passage to India (1984).

Career

Early career
Day initially worked as a clapper loader for various movies from 1944 to 1948, then as a focus puller for 1949 to 1950.

Credited as a technician of Hell Below Zero for Warwick Films. He was a cameraman for the British film The Cockleshell Heroes, released in 1955 and acted as camera operator on several more Warwick Films. He continued this through 1976, when he contributed notably to American films Exodus (1960), Lord Jim (1965), the James Bond film You Only Live Twice (1967), Davey Major Roads''' (1969), Stanley Kubrick's A Clockwork Orange (1971), as well as three films by David Lean. His last film as a cameraman was released in 1988.

Cinematography
As a cinematographer, he has worked on fourteen feature films, the first of which was Peter Collinson's British film The Long Day's Dying, released in 1968. He also worked on Bob Balaban's Parents (with Randy Quaid and Mary Beth Hurt), released in 1989. Some other notable films include Revenge of the Pink Panther (1978), David Lean's A Passage to India (1984), and Superman 4 (1987).

Additionally, Day served as a director of photography for a number of TV movies between 1983 and 1994.

Director and Second Unit Director
Day resumed his collaboration with Lewis Gilbert as second unit director of The Adventurers (1970), Operation Daybreak (1975), two more James Bond films, The Spy Who Loved Me (1977) and Moonraker (1979), and Rambo III (1988), among others.

Day also directed television episodes, such as two episodes of The New Avengers and a 1978 episode of The Professionals.

Day directed the theatrical films Green Ice (1981) and Waltz Across Texas (1982).

 Filmography 

 Accolades 

 1985 Academy Award for Best Cinematography: A Passage to India (nominated)
 1985 B.S.C. Best Cinematography Award: A Passage to India (nominated)
 1986 BAFTA Award for Best Cinematography: A Passage to India (nominated)
 1992 Gemini Award for Best Photography in a Dramatic Program or Series: Young Catherine'' (nominated)

References

English cinematographers
1927 births
2006 deaths